Cho Chun-ying (born 10 February 1955), a Taiwanese politician, is the deputy secretary of the Republic of China Presidential Office Department of Public Affairs. She has been vice magistrate of Kaohsiung County and acting mayor of Tainan City.

Health conditions 
In July 2005, Cho had her uterine fibroids treated surgically.

References 

1955 births
Alumni of the Chinese University of Hong Kong
Mayors of Tainan
Democratic Progressive Party (Taiwan) politicians
Living people
Politicians of the Republic of China on Taiwan from Kaohsiung
Women mayors of places in Taiwan